Elaine Rupp Harder (December 27, 1947 – September 24, 2013) was an American politician and businesswoman.

Born in Windom, Minnesota, Harder received her bachelor's degree from Minnesota State University, Mankato. She was a home economics teacher, had a radio talk show, was a magazine columnist, and worked for the insurance and printing businesses. Harder lived in Jackson, Minnesota. Harder served in the Minnesota House of Representatives from 1995 until 2004 as a Republican. Harder died in St. Anthony, Minnesota.

Notes

1947 births
2013 deaths
People from Windom, Minnesota
Minnesota State University, Mankato alumni
Businesspeople from Minnesota
Women state legislators in Minnesota
Republican Party members of the Minnesota House of Representatives
21st-century American politicians
21st-century American women politicians
People from Jackson, Minnesota
20th-century American businesspeople
20th-century American women